Tyrone Smith may refer to:

Tyrone Smith (athlete) (born 1984), Bermudian born long jumper
Tyrone Smith (journalist) (born 1975), Scottish television journalist/presenter for STV News
Tyrone Smith (rugby) (born 1983),  Australian-Tongan rugby league and rugby union player

See also
Ty Smith (born 1977), drummer
Tyron Smith (born 1990), American football player